US influenza statistics by flu season. From the Centers for Disease Control and Prevention page called "Disease Burden of Flu":
"Each year CDC estimates the burden of influenza in the U.S. CDC uses modeling to estimate the number of flu illnesses, medical visits, hospitalizations, and deaths related to flu that occurred in a given season. The methods used to calculate these estimates are described on CDC’s webpage, How CDC Estimates the Burden of Seasonal Flu in the U.S."

The tables below include the latest available years the CDC has provided on their website.

Hospitalizations and deaths 
 UI = uncertainty interval.
 Row numbers are static. Other columns are sortable. This allows ranking of any column.
* 2019 to 2020 season is a preliminary estimate.

 Symptomatic illnesses and medical visits 
 UI = uncertainty interval.
 Row numbers are static. Other columns are sortable. This allows ranking of any column.
* 2019 to 2020 season is a preliminary estimate.

See also
 Influenza pandemic
 2009 swine flu pandemic
 COVID-19 pandemic in the United States. Statistics section.
 COVID-19 pandemic by country and territory. Flu statistics are often compared to coronavirus statistics.
 COVID-19 pandemic cases. More statistics for comparison purposes.
 COVID-19 pandemic deaths. More statistics for comparison purposes.
 Influenza vaccine
 Bird flu
 Human flu
 Swine flu
 Horse flu
 Dog flu
 Freshers' flu
 2012–2013 flu season
 2017–2018 United States flu season
 2019–2020 United States flu season

References

External links 

United States
Disease outbreaks in the United States